Karwas is a village in Bhind district in Madhya Pradesh. It was the site of an important  fort of Gohad Rana Jat rulers. The ancestor of Bamraulis Jagdeo Singh had come from Agra and stayed at Bhind which was ruled by Aniruddh Singh Bhadauria.

References 

Villages in Bhind district